Saint Molleran's GAA is a Gaelic Athletic Association club based in Carrick-Beg, County Waterford, Ireland. The club enters teams in both GAA codes each year, which includes two adult hurling teams and one adult Gaelic football team in the Waterford County Championships.

Achievements
 Waterford Senior Hurling Championships (0): (runner-Up 1971)
 Waterford Intermediate Hurling Championships (2): 1970, 1995
 Waterford Junior Hurling Championships (1): 1964
 Waterford Junior Football Championships (1): 2004

References

External links
 Official St Molleran's GAA Club website

Gaelic games clubs in County Waterford
Hurling clubs in County Waterford
Gaelic football clubs in County Waterford